Earl of Marlborough is a title that has been created twice, both times in the Peerage of England. The first time in 1626 in favour of James Ley, 1st Baron Ley and the second in 1689 for John Churchill, 1st Baron Churchill the future Duke of Marlborough.

History
The first creation came on 5 February 1626 in favour of James Ley, 1st Baron Ley, Lord Chief Justice and Lord High Treasurer. He had already been created a 'baronet, of Westbury in the County of Wiltshire, in the Baronetage of England in 1619 and Baron Ley, of Ley in the County of Devon, on 31 December 1624, also in the Peerage of England. He was succeeded by his eldest son, the second Earl. He served as Custos Rotulorum of Somerset. In 1628, one year before he succeeded his father in the earldom, he was summoned to the House of Lords through a writ of acceleration as Baron Ley. He was succeeded by his only son, the third Earl. He was a naval commander and was killed at the Battle of Lowestoft in 1665. He was unmarried and was succeeded by his uncle, William Ley, the fourth Earl. William married Miss Hewet, daughter of Sir William Hewet, but dying without issue, in 1679, the Baronetcy of Ley, and Earldom of Marlborough, became extinct.

The second creation came on 9 April 1689, when John Churchill, 1st Baron Churchill, was created Earl of Marlborough, in the County of Wiltshire, for his role in the Glorious Revolution. He was subsequently created Duke of Marlborough, and the earldom has since descended with the dukedom.

Earls of Marlborough; First creation (1626)
James Ley, 1st Earl of Marlborough (1552–1629)
Henry Ley, 2nd Earl of Marlborough (1595–1638), elder son of 1st Earl
James Ley, 3rd Earl of Marlborough (1618–1665), only son of 2nd Earl
 William Ley, 4th Earl of Marlborough (1612–1679), younger son of 1st Earl

Earls of Marlborough; Second creation (1689)
see Duke of Marlborough

Notes

References

Earldoms in the Peerage of England
Extinct earldoms in the Peerage of England
1626 establishments in England
Noble titles created in 1626
Noble titles created in 1689